Chris Clemons may refer to:

Chris Clemons (defensive end) (born 1981), American football player
Chris Clemons (safety) (born 1985), American football player
Chris Clemons (baseball) (born 1972), baseball player
Chris Clemons (basketball) (born 1997), basketball player